Dobrivoje "Lala" Živkov (4 March 1929 – 26 October 1998) was a Yugoslav professional footballer.

Živkov played the position of forward for FK Sarajevo, and is still the club's all-time top scorer in official and unofficial matches, as well as the club's third All-time goal scorer in official competitions.

References

1929 births
1998 deaths
People from Bečej
Footballers from Sarajevo
Yugoslav footballers
Bosnia and Herzegovina footballers
FK Sarajevo players
Yugoslav First League players
Association football forwards
Burials at Bare Cemetery, Sarajevo